J Is for Jazz is an album by the J. J. Johnson Quintet which was released on the Columbia label.

Reception

Allmusic awarded the album 3 stars.

Track listing
All compositions by J. J. Johnson except where noted.
 "Naptown U.S.A." - 4:59
 "It Might as Well Be Spring" (Richard Rodgers, Oscar Hammerstein II) - 4:46
 "Tumbling Tumbleweeds" (Bob Nolan) - 4:14
 "Angel Eyes" (Matt Dennis Earl Brent) - 3:35
 "Solar" (Miles Davis) - 5:14
 "Overdrive" - 3:22
 "Undecided" (Charlie Shavers, Sid Robin) - 4:04
 "Never Let Me Go" (Joseph Scott) - 3:40
 "Chasin' the Bird" (Charlie Parker) - 4:40
 "Cube Steak" - 3:41
Recorded at Columbia 30th Street Studios, NYC on July 24, 1956 (tracks 4, 6 & 7), July 25, 1956 (tracks 3, 5, 8 & 10) and July 27, 1956 (tracks 1, 2 & 9)

Personnel
J. J. Johnson – trombone
Bobby Jaspar – tenor saxophone, flute
Tommy Flanagan (tracks 1, 2 & 9), Hank Jones (tracks 3-8 & 10) – piano
Percy Heath (tracks 4, 6 & 7), Wilbur Little (tracks 1-3, 5 & 8-10) – bass
Elvin Jones – drums

References

Columbia Records albums
J. J. Johnson albums
1956 albums
Albums produced by Cal Lampley